Miguel Dungo may refer to:

 Miguel Dungo Jr., Filipino tennis player of the 1950s and 1960s
 Miguel Dungo III, Filipino tennis player of the 1980s, son of the above